Sains-lès-Pernes (literally Sains near Pernes) is a commune in the Pas-de-Calais department in the Hauts-de-France region of France.

Geography
It is the source of the river Clarence, at a place known as "Le Buich".

Population

Places of interest
 The church of St. Berthe, dating from the sixteenth century.

See also
Communes of the Pas-de-Calais department

References

Sainslespernes